Beavon is a surname. Notable people with the surname include:

Cyril Beavon (born 1937), English footballer
Kate Beavon (born 2000), South African swimmer
Stuart Beavon (born 1958), English footballer
Stuart Beavon (born 1984), English footballer